Iron Flowers is an album released by country/folk artist and voice actress Grey DeLisle; her fourth release. It comes in an Enhanced CD format, which includes "Analog Journey into Iron Flowers". This enhanced content includes interviews with DeLisle detailing the album's tracks and the recording of them.

Track listing
"Bohemian Rhapsody" (Freddie Mercury) (3:43)
"Joanna" (DeLisle) (4:25)
"Right Now" (DeLisle, Etzioni) (3:33)
"Who Made You King?" (Etzioni, Lorber) (4:40)
"God's Got It" (Charlie Jackson) (2:48)
"The Bloody Bucket" (DeLisle, Etzioni) (3:56)
"Iron Flowers" (DeLisle, Hammond) (3:59)
"Blueheart" (DeLisle, The Amazements) (3:46)
"Sweet Little Bluebird" (DeLisle, Etzioni) (3:20)
"Inside Texas" (DeLisle, Etzioni) (5:10)

Personnel
Grey DeLisle - autoharp, vocals
Marvin Etzioni - acoustic guitar, mandolin, electric guitar, rhythm guitar, production, Mandola, Marxophone, Casio, guitar engineer, ARP Odyssey, electric Mando-cello
Sheldon Gomberg - upright bass
Murry Hammond - acoustic guitar, bass guitar
Don Heffington - castanets, drums, maracas, snare drums, sleigh bells
Greg Leisz - pedal steel guitar
Dave Mattacks - drums
The Amazements - Elon Etzioni, Brendon Morrison, Liam Morrison

2005 albums
Grey DeLisle albums
Sugar Hill Records albums